Zaborowo  is a village in the administrative district of Gmina Kozłowo, within Nidzica County, Warmian-Masurian Voivodeship, in northern Poland.

The village has a population of 150.

Notable residents
 Albrecht Konrad Finck von Finckenstein (1660–1735), tutor of Frederick II of Prussia

References

Villages in Nidzica County